Lene Løseth (born 26 November 1986, in Ålesund) is a Norwegian alpine skier who races for Spjelkavik IL. 

At the WC 2007 in Åre she came 38th in the giant slalom and 23rd in the slalom.

She is Mona and Nina Løseth's elder sister. In a World Cup competition in slalom in Flachau in January 2010 all three sisters qualified for the final.

References

1986 births
Living people
Norwegian female alpine skiers
Sportspeople from Ålesund